Melanie Balcomb (born September 24, 1962) is an American basketball coach. She was previously the head coach for the Vanderbilt women's basketball team in 2016.

Career
Balcomb attended Hightstown High School, in Hightstown, New Jersey, where she starred as a point guard for the girls' varsity basketball team from 1976 to 1980. She attended Trenton State College (now The College of New Jersey), where she set school records for career assists and steals, and she scored over 1,000 points in her collegiate basketball career.

Before arriving at Vanderbilt, Balcomb was head coach at Xavier for seven years, leading the Lady Musketeers to a school-record 31 wins and an Elite Eight appearance in 2001.

Balcomb resigned from Vanderbilt at the end of 2016 season and was subsequently hired by the South Carolina women's basketball team to direct offensive analytics.

Head coaching record

References

External links
 Vanderbilt profile

1962 births
Living people
American women's basketball coaches
Basketball coaches from New Jersey
Basketball players from Trenton, New Jersey
Hightstown High School alumni
People from Cranbury, New Jersey
Sportspeople from Mercer County, New Jersey
The College of New Jersey alumni
Vanderbilt Commodores women's basketball coaches
Point guards
Xavier Musketeers women's basketball coaches
Ashland Eagles women's basketball coaches
Ohio Dominican Panthers